Painsthorpe Abbey was a short-lived monastery of the Anglican Order of St. Benedict. It was established in 1902 at Painsthorpe in the East Riding of Yorkshire by Aelred Carlyle, a friend of Charles Chapman Grafton, Episcopal Bishop of Fond du Lac and an inspiration for Alfred Hope Patten. In 1906 the monks left Yorkshire for Caldey Abbey in Wales. A brick chapel had been added to Painsthorpe Hall which served as the monastery.

External links
Sourcebook

References

Anglican monasteries in the United Kingdom
Monasteries in the East Riding of Yorkshire
Benedictine monasteries in England